Aislinn Claire Paul (born March 5, 1994) is a Canadian actress. She is best known for her role in Degrassi: The Next Generation as Clare Edwards, for which she has won two Canadian Screen Awards (2015 and 2016) for Best Performance in a Children's or Youth Program or Series, in addition to receiving a Young Artist Award nomination in 2010. She also starred in the Hulu series Freakish.

Early life
Paul was born in Toronto, Ontario, Canada and began working as a child actor at a very young age, starring in commercials and advertising campaigns.

Career
Paul was cast as a recurring character on Degrassi in 2006 when she was only 12 years old and was upgraded to regular a couple years later for season 8. After appearing in nine seasons, she became one of the longest running cast members, eventually exiting the show in 2015 after appearing in more than 220 episodes. For her performance on the show, she was nominated for a Young Artists Award for Best Supporting Young Actress in 2010. In 2015, she won the Canadian Screen Award for Best Performance in a Children's or Youth Program or Series.

Her other notable TV roles include Hannah Woodal in Wild Card, Amber in the CBS Film, Candles on Bay Street, Isabella in the HBO series Tell Me You Love Me, and Alexa Ammon in the Lifetime Movie Network Original Murder in the Hamptons.

In 2015, Paul starred as Phoebe Frady in Heroes Reborn and won a second Canadian Screen Award for her final performance in Degrassi.

She starred in the first season of Hulu series Freakish in 2016.

Personal life
Paul studied at and graduated from the Etobicoke School of the Arts alongside fellow Degrassi star Chloe Rose.

Filmography

Awards and nominations

References

External links 
 

1994 births
Living people
21st-century Canadian actresses
Actresses from Toronto
Canadian child actresses
Canadian film actresses
Canadian television actresses